The Welgun was a prototype submachine gun developed by the British irregular warfare organisation, the Special Operations Executive. Although it performed well in tests, it was never adopted, and was produced in small numbers only.

Development
When issuing arms to resistance fighters throughout Europe, SOE favoured short-range, rapid fire, cost effective weapons which required little training to use, or maintenance in the field. Initially, they favoured the British Army issue crude and cheap Sten sub machine gun, but this weapon perhaps went too far in the directions of cheapness and simplicity. Early marks were notoriously unreliable and prone to accidental discharges, and some were so badly manufactured that they were issued to resistance fighters with "burrs" in the barrel or working parts which might even cause the weapon to explode when fired.

One of SOE's research departments, the Inter Services Research Bureau at Station IX in The Frythe, a former hotel outside Welwyn Garden City, sought a weapon more suited to the organisation's needs in early 1942. They had already produced the prototype Norm Gun (named after its inventor, Eric Norman) but this was too expensive for large-scale manufacture.

A cheaper alternative was produced by F.T. Bridgman. Various other official bodies, and the Birmingham Small Arms factory also had input. In early 1943, Sir Charles Hambro, the Director of the SOE, sought permission to have the weapon put into large-scale production. Six pre-production models were tested against comparative weapons, such as the Sten Mk. IV. The Welgun was less reliable in poor operating conditions such as mud or dust, because the first models had been made with too close tolerances. It was however, more accurate and easier to use. Later pre-production models had more generous tolerances and were as reliable as the Sten under conditions of deliberate abuse. Various Allied commando and Army organisations were enthusiastic about the weapon.

In the event, the Sten Mk. IV was chosen for mass production over the Welgun, though it did not enter widespread service either. No official reason for the Welgun's rejection has survived.

Peter Kemp of SOE was parachuted into Albania with a Welgun, but its first use in battle (ambushing a German staff car) resulted in it jamming, which Kemp attributed to adjustments made previously by an armourer who inadvertently damaged the mechanism.

Design and Characteristics
The weapon was a fairly conventional blowback design. It used the same 9mm Parabellum cartridge as the Sten. Since this round was also used by the Axis, resistance fighters could obtain ammunition from enemy sources. The Welgun used the same 32-round single-feed magazine as the Sten, a potential source of trouble as this design was unreliable in service. The magazine fed vertically, rather than sideways as in the Sten.

The Welgun had a folding stock. When this was folded to lie over the barrel and body of the gun, the overall length of the weapon was a little over 16 inches, allowing easy carriage and concealment. The Welgun also had a wooden pistol grip, and vestigial wooden foregrip, which contributed to its accuracy and balance.

Name
The "Wel-" prefix to the weapon's name derives from Welwyn Garden City, near which Station IX was located. The prefix identified several weapons and other items of equipment designed or produced by this establishment, such as the Welrod assassination weapon.

See also
 BSA experimental model 1949

References
Notes

Bibliography

External links
Photograph of Welgun in Imperial War Museum collection
Link to Spanish language site, with image of weapon
SecurityArms.com

World War II infantry weapons of the United Kingdom
World War II submachine guns
Submachine guns of the United Kingdom
Insurgency weapons
Special Operations Executive
Trial and research firearms of the United Kingdom
9mm Parabellum submachine guns
Weapons and ammunition introduced in 1942